Tashi Lakpa Sherpa(born 1985) in Makalu Region, Sankhuwasabha District) is a Nepalese mountaineer who climbed Mount Everest eight times, Cho Oyu twice and other 7000 metre and 6000 metre peaks. He is currently on the mission of climbing Seven Summits and has already climbed five of them Everest, Denali, Elbrus, Kilimanjaro and Aconcagua.

Tashi Lakpa Sherpa is a Guinness World Records holder titled "The youngest person to climb Everest without the use of supplementary oxygen". In 2005 at the age of 19 Sherpa climbed the highest peak without using supplementary oxygen. Tashi and his team tried the rarest climb of Mt. Everest in Winter in 2019, though could not reach higher than Camp III 7300m of Everest via South Side.

Early life
Born and raised in remote village named Nurbuchour (Makalu) of Sankhuwasabha District, Sherpa spent his earlier days as a herdsman grazing the sheep, goats and yaks in the yards and the forest. When he was 16, he came to the capital city, Kathmandu, took basic wall and rock climbing trainings. In 2004 Tashi climbed Mt. Everest as his first mountain to climb and also the first 8000ers. Then he joined climbing activities along with his two brothers Chhang Dawa and Mingma Sherpa.

Mountains climbed by Tashi Lakpa

References

1985 births
Living people
Nepalese mountain climbers
Nepalese summiters of Mount Everest
People from Sankhuwasabha District
Sherpa summiters of Mount Everest
Summiters of K2